The Sherpa are one of the Tibetan ethnic groups native to the most mountainous regions of Nepal, Tingri County in the Tibet Autonomous Region and the Himalayas.

Most Sherpa people live in the eastern regions of Nepal and Tingri County in the Solukhumba, Khatra & Kama, Rowlawing, Barun and Pharak valleys, though some live farther West in the Bigu and in the Helambu region north of Kathmandu, Nepal. Sherpas establish gompas where they practice their religious traditions. Tengboche was the first celibate monastery in Solu-Khumbu. Sherpa people also live in Tingri County, Bhutan, and the Indian states of Sikkim and the northern portion of West Bengal, specifically the district of Darjeeling. The Sherpa language belongs to the south branch of the Tibeto-Burman languages, mixed with Eastern Tibet (Khamba) and central Tibetan dialects. However, this language is separate from Lhasa Tibetan and unintelligible to Lhasa speakers.

The number of Sherpas migrating to Western countries has significantly increased in recent years, especially to the United States. New York City has the largest Sherpa community in the United States, with a population of approximately 16,000. The 2011 Nepal census recorded 512,946 Sherpas within its borders. Members of the Sherpa population are known for their skills in mountaineering as a livelihood.

History 

Tibet to Solukhumbu at different times, giving rise to the four fundamental Sherpa clans: Minyagpa, Thimmi, Sertawa and Chawa. These four groups gradually split into the more than 20 different clans that exist today. Mahayana Buddhism religious conflict may have contributed to the migration out of Tibet in the 13th and 14th centuries and arrival in Khumbu regions of Nepal. Sherpa migrants travelled through Ü and Tsang, before crossing the Himalaya.

By the 1400s, Khumbu Sherpa people attained autonomy within the newly formed Nepali state. In the 1960s, as tension with China increased, the Nepali government influence on the Sherpa people grew. In 1976, Khumbu became a national park, and tourism became a major economic force.

Gautam (1994) concluded that the Sherpa migrated from Tibet to Nepal approximately 600 years ago, initially through Rongshar to the west and then later through the Nangpa La pass. It is presumed that the group of people from the Kham region, east of Tibet, was called "Shyar Khamba" (People who came from eastern Kham), and the place where they settled was called "Shyar Khumbu". As time passed, the "Shyar Khamba", inhabitants of Shyar Khumbu, were called Sherpa. A recent Nepal Ethnographic Museum (2001) study postulated that present-day Nepal became an integral part of the kingdom of Nepal. Since ancient times, Sherpas, like other Kirat Nepalese tribes, would move from one place to another place within the Himalayan region surviving as Alpine pastoralists and traders.

Genetics 
Genetic studies shows that much of the Sherpa population has allele frequencies which are often found in other Tibeto-Burman regions, in tested genes, the strongest affinity was for Tibetan population sample studies done in Xizang Tibetan Autonomous Region. Genetically, the Sherpa cluster closest with the sample Tibetan and Han populations.

Additionally, the Sherpa had exhibited an affinity for several Nepalese populations, with the strongest for the Rai people, followed by the Magars and the Tamang.

A 2010 study identified more than 30 genetic factors that make Tibetans' bodies well-suited for high altitudes, including EPAS1, referred to as the "super-athlete gene" that regulates the body's production of hemoglobin, allowing for greater efficiency in the use of oxygen.

A 2016 study of Sherpas in Tibet suggested that a small portion of Sherpas' and Tibetans' allele frequencies originated from separate ancient populations, which were estimated to have remained somewhat distributed for 11,000 to 7,000 years.

Haplogroup distribution 
A 2014 study observed that considerable genetic components from the Indian Subcontinent were found in Sherpa people living in Tibet. The western Y chromosomal haplogroups R1a1a-M17, J-M304, and F*-M89 comprise almost 17% of the paternal gene pool in tested individuals. In the maternal side, M5c2, M21d, and U from the west also count up to 8% of people in given Sherpa populations. However, a later study from 2015 did not support the results from the 2014 study; the 2015 study concluded that genetic sharing from the Indian subcontinent was highly limited; a 2017 study found the same.

In a 2015 study of 582 Sherpa individuals (277 males) from China and Nepal, haplogroup D-M174 was found most frequently, followed by Haplogroup O-M175, Haplogroup F-M89 and Haplogroup K-M9. The Y-chromosome haplogroup distribution for Sherpas follow a pattern similar to that for Tibetans.

Sherpa mtDNA distribution shows greater diversity, as Haplogroup A was found most frequently, followed by Haplogroup M9a, Haplogroup C4a, Haplogroup M70, and Haplogroup D. These haplogroups are also found in some Tibetan populations. However, two common mtDNA sub-haplogroups unique to Sherpas populations were identified: Haplogroup A15c1 and Haplogroup C4a3b1.

Mountaineering 

Many Sherpas are highly regarded as elite mountaineers and experts in their local area. They were valuable to early explorers of the Himalayan region, serving as guides at the extreme altitudes of the peaks and passes in the region, particularly for expeditions to climb Mount Everest. Today, the term is often used by foreigners to refer to almost any guide or climbing supporter hired for mountaineering expeditions in the Himalayas, regardless of their ethnicity. Because of this usage, the term has become a slang byword for a guide or mentor in other situations. Sherpas are renowned in the international climbing and mountaineering community for their hardiness, expertise, and experience at very high altitudes. It has been speculated that part of the Sherpas' climbing ability is the result of a genetic adaptation to living in high altitudes. Some of these adaptations include unique hemoglobin-binding capacity and doubled nitric oxide production.

Deaths in 2014 Everest avalanche 

On 18 April 2014, a serac collapsed above the Khumbu Icefall on Mount Everest, causing an avalanche of massive chunks of ice and snow which killed 16 Nepalese guides, mostly Sherpas. The 2014 avalanche is the second-deadliest disaster in Everest's history, only exceeded by avalanches in the Khumbu Icefall area a year later, on 25 April 2015, caused by a magnitude 7.8 earthquake in Nepal. In response to that tragedy and others involving deaths and injuries sustained by Sherpas hired by climbers, and the lack of government support for Sherpas injured or killed while providing their services, some Sherpa climbing guides walked off the job, and some climbing companies are no longer providing guides and porters for Everest expeditions. The Khumbu Icefall is essentially a waterfall of ice, the structure is continuously shifting and no matter how many times you trek through this area the route will be different. With that said, this is one of the most dangerous, if not the most, dangerous part of climbing Mount Everest. Climbers have to walk on ladders over crevasses, while walking underneath large serac formations that could potentially fall at any moment. Oftentimes this journey through the Khumbu Icefall is in the pitch black. It is safer for climbers to go through the icefall at night because the temperatures at night drop. Therefore, the icefall is not melting as fast as it would during the day.  These dangers have resulted in 66 deaths as of 2017. 6 deaths from falling in a crevasse, 9 deaths from a collapse in a section of the icefall, and 29 deaths from avalanches onto the icefall. With the effects of climate change melting the icefall faster the dangers of going through the Khumbu Icefall will increase, as well as the number of deaths. 
The families of those who died in the avalanche were only offered 40,000 rupees, the equivalent of about $400 US dollars, from the Nepalese government. At the time of the disaster the Sherpas were carrying loads of equipment for their clients, including many luxury items. There had been two broken ladders causing a traffic jam in the Khumbu Icefall. It is not uncommon for Sherpas to go through the Khumbu Icefall around 30 times each season, in comparison foreigners only go through the icefall 2 or 3 times during the season.  Sherpas are expected to haul all the majority of their clients gear to each of the 5 camps and set up before their clients reach the camps. During each season Sherpas typically make up to $5000 US dollars during their 2 or 3 month period of taking international clients to the summit of Everest. As of 2019, expeditions on Mt. Everest contributed $300 million. The economy of Nepal thrives off of tourism and adventure seekers. 
As a result of the 2014 disaster, the remaining Sherpas went on strike. They were angry at the government, lack of compensation, and their working conditions. The days after Sherpas came together to make a list of demands for the government. In the documentary entitled Sherpa, there is footage of one of their meetings. Sherpas wanted to cancel the climbing season that year out of respect for those who lost their lives. Even arguing that “this route has become a graveyard” and asking “how could we walk over their bodies?” as heard in the 2016 documentary Sherpa. Their clients were debating whether or not to continue to try to reach the summit of Everest because they had paid tens of thousands dollars to be there. However, international clients were fearful of this strike and how it would affect themselves and had their bags packed in case of a need for a swift escape. On top of this, rumors spread among the Sherpa community that others would hurt them if they were to continue to take foreigners on their expedition (Peedom, 2016). 
The 2014 event killed 16 Sherpas
and, in 2015, 10 Sherpas died at the Everest Base Camp after the earthquake. In total, 118 Sherpas have died on this mountain between 1921 and 2018. An April 2018 report by NPR stated that Sherpas account for one-third of Everest deaths.

The 2013 "Everest Brawl" 

Sherpas are more educated than ever before. The adult literacy rate in Nepal increased from 20.6% in 1981 to 48.6% in 2001. The obstacles in the way of education were the 10 year war with the Maoists from 1996 to 2006, the distance to school, and gender inequality preventing girls from going to school.

On April 27, 2013 Sherpas warned climbers not to ascend the mountain because they had not finished fixing the ropes. However, three experienced European climbers continued their trek. When they were stopped by Sherpas they told them they would not disrupt their work and carry on with a different route.  The climbers went through the Mingma Tenzing causing ice to fall down and hit the Sherpa crew. The climbers and the Sherpa all retreated to camp two, where the European climbers started to verbally abuse the Sherpas and even grabbed one of the Sherpa crew members' chest. The act of grabbing someone's chest at that high of an altitude can be very dangerous and can have serious consequences. When the Europeans were called for on the radio to discuss their next move, Simone Moro one of the European climbers, said “We will see; We will talk with the fucking Sherpas”. The Sherpas were already angered by the Europeans ignoring their decision to fix the ropes before anyone could continue on, but were angrier when they heard that sort of disrespect from the climbers. When Sherpas came to demand an apology the European climbers continued to be disrespectful towards the Sherpas. This vicious verbal assault resulted in the break out of a physical fight. When reporters caught wind of this event it was labeled the “Everest Brawl”. The European climbers claimed that they were scared for their lives, while Sherpas claimed they felt that they had to defend themselves.

Religion 

According to oral Buddhist traditions, the initial Tibetan migration was a search for a beyul (Buddhist pure-lands). Sherpa practised the Nyingmapa, the "Ancient" school of Buddhism. Allegedly the oldest Buddhist sect in Tibet, founded by Padmasambhava (commonly known as Guru Rinpoche) during the 8th century, it emphasizes mysticism and the incorporation of local deities shared by the pre-Buddhist Bön religion, which has shamanic elements. Sherpa particularly believe in hidden treasures and valleys. Traditionally, Nyingmapa practice was passed down orally through a loose network of lay practitioners. Monasteries with celibate monks and nuns, along with the belief in reincarnated spiritual leaders, are later adaptations.

In addition to Buddha and the great Buddhist divinities, the Sherpa also believe in numerous deities and demons who inhabit every mountain, cave, and forest. These have to be respected or appeased through ancient practices woven into the fabric of Buddhist ritual life. Many of the great Himalayan mountains are considered sacred. The Sherpa call Mount Everest Chomolungma and respect it as the "Mother of the World." Mount Makalu is respected as the deity Shankar (Shiva). Each clan reveres certain mountain peaks and their protective deities.

Today, the day-to-day Sherpa religious affairs are presided over by lamas (Buddhist spiritual leaders) and other religious practitioners living in the villages. The village lama who presides over ceremonies and rituals can be a celibate monk or a married householder. In addition, shamans (lhawa) and soothsayers (mindung) deal with the supernatural and the spirit world. Lamas identify witches (pem), act as the mouthpiece of deities and spirits, and diagnose spiritual illnesses.

An important aspect of Sherpa religion is the temple or gompa. A gompa is the prayer hall for either villages or monasteries. There are numerous gompas and about two dozen monasteries scattered throughout the Solukhumbu region. The monasteries are communities of lamas or monks (sometimes of nuns) who take a vow of celibacy and lead a life of isolation searching for truth and religious enlightenment. They are respected by and supported by the community at large. Their contact with the outside world is focused on monastery practices and annual festivals to which the public is invited, as well as the reading of sacred texts at funerals.

Sacred land in Sagarmatha (Mt. Everest) National Park, Nepal 

	Mt. Everest is located within the Sagarmatha National Park, which is a sacred landscape for local Sherpas. The word Sagarmatha means Goddess of the universe to the Sherpa community. The region is considered the “dwelling of supernatural beings”. Sherpas value life and the beauty it provides, meaning they avoid killing living creatures (ie: trees, wildlife, plants). Furthermore, Mt. Everest has attracted many tourists who unknowingly or knowingly are disrupting the sacred land of the park. For example, finding firewood has been deemed problematic. Many tourists stick with the methods they know how to do, which is oftentimes cutting down trees or taking branches off trees to make a fire. This practice is against Sherpa's spiritual law of the land. Moreover, the Sherpas do a spiritual ritual before climbing the mountain to ask the mountain for permission to climb. This ritual seems to have become a spectacle for foreign climbers. 

	In addition, the entirety of the national park is not governed by the Sherpas but rather foreigners to the land. Park managers have made an effort to try to include Sherpa's voices by creating “Buffer-Zone user groups”. These groups were made up of strong political leaders within the surrounding villages in order for their voices to be heard and make demands. However, these groups do not have any official status and the government can decide whether or not to hear these demands and/or make the changes desired by the Sherpa community.

Sherpa clothing 
Men wear long-sleeved robes called kitycow, which fall to slightly below the knee. Chhuba is tied at the waist with a cloth sash called kara, creating a pouch-like space called tolung which can be used for storing and carrying small items. Traditionally, chhuba were made from thick home-spun wool, or a variant called lokpa made from sheepskin. Chhuba are worn over raatuk, a blouse (traditionally made out of bure, white raw silk), trousers called kanam, and an outer jacket called tetung.

Women traditionally wear long-sleeved floor-length dresses of thick wool called tongkok. A sleeveless variation called angi is worn over a raatuk (blouse) in warmer weather. These are worn with colourful striped aprons; metil aprons are worn in front, and gewe in back, and are held together by an embossed silver buckle called kyetig.

Sherpa clothing resembles Tibetan clothing. Increasingly, home-spun wool and silk is being replaced by factory-made material. Many Sherpa people also now wear ready-made western clothing.

Traditional housing 

When a son marries and has children, the community may help to construct a new house, as the extended family becomes too large for a single home. The neighbours often contribute food, drinks and labour to help the family. Houses are typically spaced to allow fields in between. A spiritual ceremony may be conducted at every building stage as the house must have space for deities, humans and animals. Once constructed, the house is often handed down within a family and not sold. The house style depends on the lay of the land: old river terraces, former lake beds or mountain slopes. There are stone single-story, -story (on a slope), and the two-story houses, with ample room for animals. Many well-to-do families will have an annex shrine room for sacred statues, scriptures and ritual objects. The roof is sloping and is made from local natural materials, or imported metal. There's space in the roof to allow for fire smoke to escape. There may be an internal or external outhouse for making compost.

Social gatherings 
"A Sherpa community will most commonly get together for a party, which is held by the host with the purpose of gaining favour with the community and neighbours". Guests are invited hours before the party will start by the host's children to reduce the chance of rejection. The men are seated by order of status, with those of lesser status sitting closer to the door and men of higher status sitting by the fireplace, while the women sit in the center with no ordering. It is polite to sit in a space lower than one's proper place so one may be invited by the host to their proper place. The first several hours of the party will have only beer served, followed by the serving of food, and then several more hours of singing and dancing before people start to drift out. The act of manipulating one's neighbours into cooperation by hosting a party is known as Yangdzi, and works by expecting the hospitality done by the host with the serving of food and alcohol to be repaid.

Notable people 

One of the best-known Sherpas is Tenzing Norgay. In 1953, he and Edmund Hillary became the first people known to have reached the summit of Mount Everest. Norgay's son Jamling Tenzing Norgay also climbed Everest in honor of his father with the mountaineers Ed Viesturs and Araceli Segarra during the disastrous year of 1996.

In 2001, Temba Tsheri became the youngest Everest climber in the world (holder of the Guinness World Record), then aged 16.

In 2003, Sherpas Pemba Dorje and Lhakpa Golu competed to see who could climb Everest from base camp the fastest. On 23 May 2003, Dorje reached the summit in 12 hours and 46 minutes. Three days later, Golu beat his record by two hours, reaching the summit in 10 hours 46 minutes. On 21 May 2004, Dorje again improved the time by more than two hours with a total time of 8 hours and 10 minutes.

On 11 May 2011, Apa Sherpa successfully reached the summit of Everest for the twenty-first time, breaking his own record for the most successful ascents. He first climbed Mount Everest in 1989 at the age of 29.

One of the most famous Nepalese female mountaineers was Pasang Lhamu Sherpa, the first Nepali female climber to reach the summit of Everest, but who died during the descent. Her namesake, Pasang Lamu Sherpa Akita, has also climbed Everest, and was one of three Nepali women who were the first to reach the summit of K2. Another well-known female Sherpa was the two-time Everest summiter Pemba Doma Sherpa, who died after falling from Lhotse on 22 May 2007.

On 20 May 2011, Mingma Sherpa became the first Nepali and the first South Asian to scale all 14 of the world's highest mountains. In the process, Mingma set a new world record – he became the first mountaineer to climb all 14 peaks on first attempt.

Lakpa Tsheri Sherpa is one half of a Nepali duo that was voted "People's Choice Adventurers of the Year 2012". In April 2011, Lakpa Tsheri and Sano Babu Sunuwar made the 'Ultimate Descent': a three-month journey in which they climbed Everest, then paraglided down the mountain and proceeded to kayak through Nepal and India until they reached the Indian Ocean.

On 19 May 2012, 16-year-old Nima Chhamzi Sherpa became the youngest woman to climb Everest; the previous record holder was Nimdoma Sherpa, who summited in 2008, also at 16 years old.

Chhurim Sherpa (Nepal) summitted Everest twice in May 2012: 12 May and 19 May.  Guinness World Records recognized her for being the first female Sherpa to summit Everest twice in one climbing season.

In 2013, 30-year-old Chhang Dawa Sherpa became the youngest mountaineer to summit the 14 highest peaks, the 8000'ers.

Pratima Sherpa is the top-ranked amateur female golfer in Nepal. She was raised in a maintenance shed behind the third hole of the Royal Nepal Golf Club in Kathmandu, where her parents still live. In 2020, Forbes Magazine included her in '30 under 30' list of Asian personalities in entertainment and sports.

On 26 July 2014, Pasang Lamu Sherpa Akita, Dawa Yangzum Sherpa, and Maya Sherpa crested the 8,611-metre (28,251 ft) summit of K2, the second highest mountain in the world. In doing so, the three Nepali women became the first all-female team to climb what many mountaineers consider a much tougher challenge than Everest. The feat was announced in climbing circles as a breakthrough achievement for women in high-altitude mountaineering. Only 18 of the 376 people who have summited K2 have been women.

Another notable Sherpa is cross-country skier and ultramarathoner Dachhiri Sherpa, who represented Nepal at the 2006, 2010, and 2014 Winter Olympics.

Nepalese Minister of Culture and Tourism Kripasur Sherpa and the Ambassador to Australia Lucky Sherpa both come from Sherpa communities.

Mountain guide Kami Rita Sherpa holds the world record for the number of successful climbs to the summit of Mount Everest. Most recently, he scaled the mountain for a 26th time on 7 May 2022, breaking his own record set 7 May 2021. Two others, Apa Sherpa and Phurba Tashi Sherpa, have successfully summited on 21 occasions.

Mountaineer PK Sherpa and his 14-year-old-son Sonam Sherpa will lead the "First Father and Son Mountaineers" for a global awareness campaign about climate change and global warming. Both father and son will jointly climb all the seven highest summits of seven continents from March 2019 to May 2020.

Peter James Sherpa- Mountaineer, led Expeditions in Mount Everest multiple times notably from 1989 to 2001 when he died on the north face due to lack of oxygen- he was well known for climbing without oxygen tanks or masks due to his unusually large lung capacity and unique ability to breathe low Levels of oxygen. His body was not able to be recovered from the mountain and a tribute was installed at base camp to memorialise him

Lhakpa Sherpa currently holds the record for most successful attempts at scaling Everest out of any woman in the world. On May 12, 2022, she broke her own previous record and climbed Everest for the tenth time.

See also 
 Demographics of Nepal
 List of monasteries in Nepal
 Tengboche
 Sherpa (emissary)

References

External links 

 Everything about himali Sherpa Culture
 Tapting Sherpa Kyidug – a Sherpa community group in Kathmandu
 Sherpa in Nepal: History, Culture, Religion, Language
 Sherpa dictionary
 Gaiety of Spirit:  The Sherpas of Khumbu
 Beyul Khumbu: The Sherpa and Sagarmatha (Mount Everest National Park and Buffer Zone, Nepal)

 
Sino-Tibetan-speaking people
Nepalese mountain climbers
Nyingma
Gurkhas
Buddhist communities of China
Buddhist communities of Nepal
Buddhist communities of Bhutan
Buddhist communities of India
Mountaineering in Nepal